Orestis Stamatopoulos (2 April 1916 – 13 June 2009), also known as John Saville, was a Greek-British Marxist historian, long associated with Hull University. He was an influential writer on British Labour History in the second half of the twentieth century, and also known for his multi-volume work, the Dictionary of Labour Biography, edited in collaboration with others.

Life and career
He was born Orestis Stamatopoulos in 1916, near Gainsborough, Lincolnshire to  Orestis Stamatopoulos, a Greek engineer who worked for a Lincolnshire engineering firm, and Edith Vessey, a working class Lincolnshire woman. Shortly after Saville's birth, his father was called to Greece for military service and was subsequently killed during the war. His mother remarried to widowed tailor Alfred Saville, and he was brought up in Romford. He later took his step-father's family name.

He attended Romford Grammar School, won a scholarship to Royal Liberty School in London and another to the London School of Economics, where he joined the Communist Party of Great Britain (CPGB) and met his soon-to-be wife, Constance Saunders (he was an active member of the CPGB until 1956). He graduated in 1937 with a First in Economics. Called up in 1940, he had the leftwing equivalent of a good war: "I had several large-scale quarrels with authority, although I was a good and efficient soldier". Against the party line, he refused to take a commission, but advanced rapidly from anti-aircraft gunner to gunnery sergeant-major instructor and regimental sergeant major, engaged in political work wherever he went – especially, from 1943 to 1946, in India.

Whilst in India, Saville met Nehru and leaders of the Muslim League and his friendship with Indian communist students in Britain, all from establishment families, opened most anti-imperial doors, reinforced his own firm, but no longer uncritical, convictions. (Unlike him, Constance had never accepted the Moscow-imposed party line of 1939–41, which followed the Molotov–Ribbentrop pact). The Cold War, particularly frozen during the years of the Korean War and McCarthyism, made it easier to maintain them.

He soon became a pillar of the Communist Party Historians' Group ("intellectually my lifeline"), and also of the Hull Communist party and its associated organisations, while building a double expertise in 19th-century British economic history and labour history.

He was deeply involved in the crisis of the British Communist Party in 1956, following the Soviet invasion of Hungary. Khrushchev's denunciation of Stalin in 1956, or, more exactly, the failure of the British CP leadership to recognise its significance, transformed the Historians' Group from loyalists into vocal critics. Saville's was the first voice raised at its meetings. Breaking his affiliation with the cluster of British Marxist historians known as the Communist Party Historians Group, Saville emerged as one of the founders of the New Reasoner, in partnership with another Yorkshire Communist historian, E. P. Thompson, part of a group of dissident Marxists who condemned the Soviet intervention in Hungary in 1956.

Saville became Professor of Economic History at Hull University in 1973, where he had taught since 1947. He was associated with the Socialist Register (editor with Ralph Miliband) and the multi-volume Dictionary of Labour Biography; from 1972 onwards he was one of the editors of the ten-volume Dictionary.

His acquaintances and co-thinkers included John Griffith, Stuart Hall, Philip Larkin, Doris Lessing, Ralph Miliband, Sir John Pratt, Raphael Samuel and E. P. Thompson. Harry Newton, a left-wing student, had passed himself off as a family friend. Newton's true identity, as a MI5 agent planted at his home in Hull, was uncovered after his death.

He is commemorated with a green plaque on The Avenues, Kingston upon Hull.

His beloved wife Constance died in 2007. He was survived by their three sons, a daughter, and two granddaughters.

Works
 Ernest Jones, Chartist: Selections from the Writings and Speeches of Ernest Jones (1952) editor
 Democracy and the Labour Movement: Essays in Honour of Dona Torr (1954) editor
 Rural Depopulation in England and Wales, 1851–1951 (1957)
 The Age of Improvement 1783–1867 (1964) editor with Asa Briggs
 The Red Republican & The Friend of the People: A Facsimile Reprint (1966, 2 volumes) editor
 Essays in Labour History 1886–1923 (1967) editor with Asa Briggs, and later volumes
 A Selection of the Political Pamphlets of Charles Bradlaugh (1970) editor
 Selection of the Social and Political Pamphlets of Annie Besant (1970), editor
 Dictionary of Labour Biography (from 1972, ten volumes) editor with Joyce M. Bellamy, David E. Martin
 Marxism and History (1974) Inaugural Lecture, University of Hull, 6 November 1973
 Working Conditions in the Victorian Age: Debates on the Issue from 19th Century Critical Journals (1973)
 Marxism and Politics (1977) editor with Ralph Miliband, Marcel Liebman, Leo Panitch
 Ideology and the Labour Movement: Essays Presented to John Saville (1979) David Rubinstein
 Nottinghamshire Labour Movement, 1880–1939 (1985) with Peter Wyncoll
 1848: The British State and the Chartist Movement (1987)
 The Labour Movement in Britain (1988)
 The Labour Archive at the University of Hull (1989)
 The Politics of Continuity: British Foreign Policy and the Labour Government, 1945–46 (1993)
 The Consolidation of the Capitalist State, 1800–1850 (1994)
 Memoirs from the Left (2002)

References

External links
John Saville Archive at Marxists Internet Archive
A Life on the Left, Paul Blackledge's review of John Saville's autobiography Memoirs from the Left.

People educated at the Royal Liberty Grammar School
Academics of the University of Hull
Alumni of the London School of Economics
British communists
British Marxists
British people of Greek descent
British Marxist historians
Royal Artillery soldiers
British Army personnel of World War II
People from Gainsborough, Lincolnshire
1916 births
2009 deaths
Communist Party of Great Britain members
Communist Party Historians Group members